Telechrysis is a genus of gelechioid moths and only genus in the Telechrysidini tribe. The genus itself contains only one species, Telechrysis tripuncta, which is found in most of Europe, except the Iberian Peninsula, the Benelux, Ireland, Lithuania, Croatia, Austria and Greece.

The wingspan is 10–14 mm. Adults have three pale, evenly spaced spots on each forewing. They are on wing in May and June.

The larvae are thought to feed in dead or rotting wood.

Taxonomy
In certain systematic layouts, it is placed in the subfamily Amphisbatinae of the concealer moth family (Oecophoridae). Delimitation of Amphisbatinae versus the close relatives Depressariidae and Oecophorinae is a major problem of Gelechioidea taxonomy and systematics, and some authors separate the former two as full-blown families, and/or include the Amphisbatinae in Depressariinae (or Depressariidae), or merge them in the Oecophorinae outright.

References

Depressariinae
Monotypic moth genera
Moths described in 1828
Moths of Europe
Taxa named by Adrian Hardy Haworth